When The Night Falls... Do You Hear (Me)? is the 15th album by Mandopop singer Valen Hsu that was released on 10 November 2011.

Track listing
 夜．微醺 (Intro: When The Night Falls... (Instrumental))
 老实情歌 (The Honest Love Song)
 巴黎草莓 (Parisberries)
 I Wanna Be Loved By You
 浪人情歌 (Wanderer's Love Song)
 只爱陌生人 (Comfort of Strangers)
 蓝色啤酒海 (Bottle Of Ocean Blue)
 春光乍洩 (Happy Together)
 祕密 (Secret)
 向前走(台语) (On My Way)

References

External links
Valen Hsu Official Site

2011 albums
Valen Hsu albums